Glengarnock High railway station was a railway station serving the village of Glengarnock, North Ayrshire, Scotland as part of the Lanarkshire and Ayrshire Railway.

History 
The station opened 2 December 1889 and was simply known as Glengarnock. Upon the grouping of the L&AR into the London, Midland and Scottish Railway in 1923, the station was renamed Glengarnock High on 2 June 1924. The station closed to passengers almost exactly forty one years after opening on 1 December 1930, however freight services remained until 1945.

Services 
A shuttle service ran via this station on the way to Giffen from Kilbirnie and back, with around nine return journeys per day during the week and an extra two on Saturdays.

References

Notes

Sources 
 
 
 

Disused railway stations in North Ayrshire
Railway stations in Great Britain opened in 1889
Railway stations in Great Britain closed in 1930
Former Caledonian Railway stations
Garnock Valley